Nyame is both a given name and surname. Notable people with the name include:

 Jolly Nyame (born 1955), Governor of Taraba State in Nigeria 
 Jayden Antwi-Nyame (born 1998), English footballer
 Nyame Brown, artist from San Francisco
 Victoria Nyame (died 1980), Ghanaian politician

See also
 Nyam (disambiguation)